Rotceh Américo Aguilar Rupany (born 12 June 2001) is a Peruvian footballer who plays as a right-back for Peruvian Primera División side Deportivo Municipal.

Career

Club career
Aguilar played for Esther Grande and Deportivo Municipal during his time as a youth player. He got his professional for Deportivo Municipal in the Peruvian Primera División on 2 March 2019 against Deportivo Binacional. Aguilar played as a centre back the whole game, which Municipal lost 3–0. He made a total of five appearances for the club in the 2019 season.

On 16 November 2021, Aguilar signed a contract extension until the end of 2022.

International career
During 2019, Aguilar was called up for the Peru U18 national team a few times. In June 2020, Aguilar was also called up for the Peru national under-20 football team. He made it to the final squad, which was announced at the end of August 2020.

References

External links
 

Living people
2001 births
Association football defenders
Peruvian footballers
Peruvian Primera División players
Esther Grande footballers
Deportivo Municipal footballers
Footballers from Lima